Sangaris sexmaculata is a species of beetle in the family Cerambycidae. It was described by Monné in 1993. It is known from Peru.

References

sexmaculata
Beetles described in 1993